Hessians ( or ) were German soldiers who served as auxiliaries to the British Army during the American Revolutionary War. The term is an American synecdoche for all Germans who fought on the British side, since 65% came from the German states of Hesse-Kassel and Hesse-Hanau. Known for their discipline and martial prowess, around 30,000 Germans fought for the British during the war, around 25% of British land forces.

While regarded, both contemporaneously and historiographically, as mercenaries, Hessians were legally distinguished as auxiliaries: whereas mercenaries served a foreign government of their own accord, auxiliaries were soldiers hired out to a foreign party by their own government, to which they remained in service. Auxiliaries were a major source of income for many small and relatively poor German states, typically serving in wars in which their governments were neutral. Like most auxiliaries of this period, Hessians served with foreign armies as entire units, fighting under their own flags, commanded by their usual officers, and wearing their existing uniforms. 

Hessians played an essential role in the Revolutionary War, particularly in the northern theater. They served with distinction in many battles, most notably at White Plains and Fort Washington. The added manpower and skill of German troops greatly sustained the British war effort, though it also outraged colonists and increased support for the Revolutionary cause. The use of "large armies of foreign mercenaries" was one of the 27 colonial grievances against King George III in the United States Declaration of Independence, while the Patriots used the deployment of Hessians to support their claims of British violations of the colonists' rights.

Origin and history
The use of foreign soldiers was not unusual in 18th-century Europe. In the two centuries leading up to the American Revolution, the continent was characterized by constant warfare, and military manpower was in very high demand. Germany was not yet a unified nation, but a collection of several hundred states loosely organized under the Holy Roman Empire. Conflict between and among these states led to the creation of professional armies, which were consequently experienced and well trained. Many German societies became militarized, with most men undergoing annual training from adolescence well into adulthood, often serving for life or until they were too old. German states varied considerably in size and wealth, and several came to rely on their troops as an economic resource, especially since sustaining a standing army was costly. 

When military conflict broke out, as it often did in Europe, German states provided a ready supply of trained troops prepared to go into action immediately. Hesse-Kassel soon emerged as the most prominent source of soldiers. To field a large professional army with a relatively small population, it became the most militarized state in Europe: 5.2 to 6.7% of its population was under arms in the 18th century—with one in four households having someone serving in the army—a larger proportion than even heavily-militarized Prussia. Whereas Prussia relied partly on mercenaries from other German states, Hesse-Kassel employed only Landeskinder, native men. The military was the dominant force in the country. All Hessian males were registered for military service at the age of seven, and from the age of 16 until 30, had to annually present themselves to an official for possible recruitment. Only those whose occupation was considered vital to the country could be exempt. Those deemed "expendable", such as vagrants and the unemployed, could be conscripted at any time.

Hessian military service was notably strict and demanding, emphasizing iron discipline through draconian punishment. However, morale was generally high, and soldiers were said to take pride in their service. Officers were usually well-educated, and in contrast to most European armies, promoted on the basis of merit. Soldiers were paid relatively high wages, and their families were exempt from certain taxes. Although plunder was officially forbidden, it remained common practice (as in most military forces at the time), offering another incentive for service. Overall, Hessian troops were considered superb fighters, even by their opponents.

The Hessian military became a major source of economic strength. Hesse-Kassel manufactured its own weapons and uniforms, and its textile industry was so prosperous from supplying the military that workers could afford to buy meat and wine every day. The revenue from renting the army to the British equaled roughly 13 years' worth of taxes, allowing the Landgrave of Hesse-Kassel, Friedrich II, to reduce taxes by one-third between the 1760s and 1784. A self-styled enlightened despot, he also oversaw public-works projects, administered a public welfare system, and encouraged education. American historian Edward Jackson Lowell lauded Friedrich II for spending British money wisely, describing him as "one of the least disreputable of the princes who sent mercenaries to America".

Well before the American Revolutionary War, Hessian soldiers were familiar in battlefields across 18th-century Europe.

In most of these wars, Hesse-Hanau was never formally a belligerent. While its troops remained members of the Hessian military, and even fought in their national uniform, they were hired out for service in other armies, without their government having any stake in the conflict. Thus, Hessians could serve on opposing sides of the same conflict. In the War of the Austrian Succession, both Britain and Bavaria employed Hessian soldiers against one another; in the Seven Years' War, the forces of Hesse-Kassel served with both the Anglo-Hanoverian and the Prussian armies against the French; although Hesse-Kassel was technically allied to Britain and Prussia, her troops were actually leased by the British.

Nevertheless, the practice of lending out auxiliaries did sometimes result in direct consequences. In July 1758, during the course of the Seven Years' War, most of Hesse-Kassel, including its capital, was occupied by a French army under Charles de Rohan, Prince of Soubise, which easily overcame the home defence force of 6,000 Hessian militiamen. Soubise ordered his troops to live off the land, take high-ranking hostages, and extort payments of cash and produce, with the intention of forcing Hessian troops to withdraw from the war. Hessian and allied forces attempted to liberate their homeland, but were repulsed at the Battle of Sandershausen on 23 July. Following two sieges of Cassel, in 1761 and 1762, the capital was retaken, which constituted the last military action of the war.

"Mercenaries" versus "auxiliaries"
The characterization of Hessian troops as "mercenaries" remains controversial over two centuries later. American history textbooks refer to them as "mercenaries", and they are still widely perceived as such in the popular imagination of the United States. American historian Charles Ingrao describes Hesse as a "mercenary state" whose prince rented out his regiments to fund his governmental expenditures. By contrast, British historian Stephen Conway referred to them as "auxiliaries". Military historians Dennis Showalter and Rodney Atwood note that Hessians would not have been legally considered mercenaries at the time, but rather auxiliaries. Whereas mercenaries served a foreign ruler in an individual capacity, auxiliaries forces were controlled by a state, and their foreign service was in direct competition to professional mercenaries. (Similarly, in the twentieth century, the Moroccan Goumiers were attached as auxiliaries to the French Army of Africa.)

Hessians would not be categorized as mercenaries under modern international law. Protocol I (1977) to the Geneva Convention defines a mercenary as "any person who ... has not been sent by a State which is not a Party to the conflict on official duty as a member of its armed forces." Hessian troops served in America on official duty from the armed forces of Hesse-Cassel and Hesse-Hanau.  Protocol I also requires a mercenary to be "promised, by or on behalf of a Party to the conflict, material compensation substantially in excess of that promised or paid to combatants of similar ranks and functions in the armed forces of that Party." While not formally incorporated into the British military, Hessian troops were paid the same wages as British soldiers.

Service during the American Revolution

Great Britain maintained a relatively small standing army, so it found itself in great need of troops at the outset of the American Revolutionary War. Several German princes saw an opportunity to earn extra income by hiring out their regular army units for service in America. Their troops entered the British service not as individuals, but in entire units, with their usual uniforms, flags, equipment, and officers. Methods of recruitment varied according to the state of origin. The contingent from Waldeck was drawn from an army based on universal conscription, from which only students were exempt. Other German princes relied on long-service voluntary enlistment supplemented by conscription when numbers fell short. Many princes were closely related to the British House of Hanover and were comfortable placing their troops under British command.

A total of 29,875 German troops fought alongside British troops in the Revolutionary War, of which 16,992 came from Hesse-Kassel and 2,422 from Hesse-Hanau. Other contingents came from Brunswick (4,300), Ansbach-Bayreuth (2,353), Anhalt-Zerbst (1,119), and Waldeck (1,225). As the majority of the German troops came from Hesse, Americans use the term "Hessians" to refer to all German troops fighting on the British side.

Deployment
Hessian troops included Jägers, hussars, three artillery companies, and four battalions of grenadiers. Most infantrymen were chasseurs (sharpshooters), musketeers, and fusiliers. Line infantry was armed with muskets, while the Hessian artillery used the three-pound cannon. The elite Jäger battalions used the Büchse, a short, large-caliber rifle well-suited to woodland combat. Initially, the typical regiment was made up of 500 to 600 men. Later in the war, due to death in battle, death by disease, and general desertion to settle in the Colonies, the regiments may have been reduced to only around 300 to 400 men.

The first Hessian troops to arrive in North America landed at Staten Island, New York on August 15, 1776. Their first engagement was less than two weeks later, in the Battle of Long Island, the first major battle in the war. Hessians proved decisive to the British victory, and subsequently fought in almost every battle that year. 

By 1777, the British used them mainly as garrison and patrol troops. Hessians fought at the Battle of Bennington, the turning point of the Saratoga campaign. Around 1,000 Hessians were defeated, killed, and captured by a raw, untrained militia force from Vermont, New Hampshire, and Massachusetts. General John Burgoyne lost 1,000 of his 8,000 soldiers at Bennington, and the loss of so many Hessians doomed his army later. An assortment of Hessians fought in the battles and campaigns in the southern states during 1778–1780 (including Guilford Court House), and two regiments fought at the Siege of Yorktown in 1781. Hessians also served in Nova Scotia for five years (1778–1783), where they protected the colony from American privateers, such as during the 1782 Raid on Lunenburg.

Notwithstanding their reputation as skilled and disciplined fighters, many British soldiers shared the American distrust of Hessians, who often spoke little or no English and were perceived as crude and barbaric.

 

Hessians, for their part, spoke out against executions of captured prisoners of war after the Battle of Long Island, especially since many were of German descent; one Hessian is quoted as saying, "many among them were Germans, and that cut me doubly to the heart". One American woman spoke to the Hessians of her reappraisal of them after the battle, as they refused to take part in any plundering: "she saw very plainly there was no truth in what people
had told her of the Hessians, namely that they were cruel".

American attitudes
 

Americans, both Revolutionaries and Loyalists, often feared the Hessians, believing them to be rapacious and brutal mercenaries. The American Declaration of Independence, written roughly a year after hostilities broke out, condemned King George III of "transporting large Armies of foreign Mercenaries to [complete] the works of death, desolation and tyranny, already begun with circumstances of Cruelty & perfidy scarcely paralleled in the most barbarous ages, and totally unworthy the Head of a civilized nation." Throughout the war, reports of plundering by Hessians were said to have galvanized neutral colonists to join the Revolutionary side.

General Washington's Continental Army had crossed the Delaware River to make a surprise attack on the Hessians in the early morning of December 26, 1776. In the Battle of Trenton, the Hessian force of 1,400 was quickly overwhelmed by the Continentals, with only about 20 killed and 100 wounded, but 1,000 captured.

The Hessians captured in the Battle of Trenton were paraded through the streets of Philadelphia to raise American morale; anger at their presence helped the Continental Army recruit new soldiers. Most of the prisoners were sent to work as farmhands.

By early 1778, negotiations for the exchange of prisoners between Washington and the British had begun in earnest. These included Nicholas Bahner(t), Jacob Trobe, George Geisler, and Conrad Grein (Konrad Krain), who were a few of the Hessian soldiers who deserted the British forces after being returned in exchange for American prisoners of war. These men were both hunted by the British for being deserters and by many of the colonists as a foreign enemy.

Throughout the war, Americans tried to entice Hessians to desert the British, emphasizing the large and prosperous German-American community. The U.S. Congress authorized the offer of land of up to 50 acres (roughly 20 hectares) to individual Hessian soldiers who switched sides. British soldiers were offered 50 to 800 acres, depending on rank.

Many Hessian prisoners were held in camps at the interior city of Lancaster, Pennsylvania, home to a large German community known as the Pennsylvania Dutch. German prisoners were subsequently treated well, with some volunteering for extra work assignments, helping to replace local men serving in the Continental Army. After the war, many POWs never returned to Germany and instead accepted American offers of religious freedom and free land, becoming permanent settlers. By contrast, British prisoners were also held in Lancaster, but these men did not respond favorably to good treatment and often tried to escape.

After the war ended in 1783, some 17,313 German soldiers returned to their homelands. Of the 12,526 who did not return, about 7,700 had died; some 1,200 were killed in action, and 6,354 died from illnesses or accidents, mostly the former. About 5,000 German troops, most of whom had been press-ganged or conscripted in their countries of origin, opted to settle in either the United States or Canada.

Commanding officers 

 Wilhelm von Knyphausen
 Oberst Franz Carl Erdmann Freiherr (Baron) von Seitz – led the regiment in the Battle of Fort Washington
 Oberst Johann Rall, commanding officer of the Hessian forces at the Battle of Trenton
 Lieutenant General Friedrich Wilhelm von Lossberg, as Colonel led the von Lossberg Regiment (Alt) at the Battle of White Plains and Fort Washington. He served in Newport from 1776 until 1779 and played a decisive role at the Battle of Rhode Island. In May 1782 upon the departure of Lieutenant General Knyphausen, Lossberg replaced him as the commander of the Hessian troops in North America.

Units 

Infantry
Hesse-Cassel Jäger Corps
Fusilier Regiment von Ditfurth
Fusilier Regiment Erbprinz, later (1780) Musketeer Regiment Erbprinz
Fusilier Regiment von Knyphausen
Fusilier Regiment von Lossberg
Grenadier Regiment von Rall, later (1777) von Woellwarth; (1779) von Trümbach; (1781) d'Angelelli 
 Hesse-Hanau Free Corps
 Hesse-Hanau Jägers
Hesse-Hanau Regiment 
Merged grenadier battalions (from grenadier companies of several fusilier and musketeer regiments):
1st Battalion Grenadiers von Linsing
2nd Battalion Grenadiers von Block (later von Lengerke)
3rd Battalion Grenadiers von Minnigerode (later von Löwenstein)
4th Battalion Grenadiers von Köhler (later von Graf; von Platte)
Garrison Regiment von Bünau
Garrison Regiment von Huyn (later von Benning)
Garrison Regiment von Stein (later von Seitz; von Porbeck)
Garrison Regiment von Wissenbach (later von Knoblauch)
Leib Infantry Regiment (Leib-Infanterie-Regiment)
Musketeer Regiment von Donop 
Musketeer Regiment von Trümbach (later von Bose (1779))
Musketeer Regiment von Mirbach (later Jung von Lossberg (1780))
Musketeer Regiment Prinz Carl
Musketeer Regiment von Wutgenau (later Landgraf (1777))
 First Light Infantry Battalion
 Second Light Infantry Battalion
 First Formation Infantry Battalion
 Second Infantry Battalion
 Third Formation Infantry Battalion
 Fourth Formation Infantry Battalion
 Fifth Formation Infantry Battalion
 Sixth Formation Infantry Battalion
 Seventh Formation Infantry Battalion
 Eighth Formation Infantry Battalion

Cavalry
 First Dragoon Cavalry Regiment (1804–1812, red jacket); change to the First Light Dragoon Cavalry Regiment (1812–1816, blue jacket)
 Second Dragoon Cavalry Regiment (1805–1812, red jacket); change to the Second Light Dragoon Cavalry Regiment (1812–1816, blue jacket)
 First Hussar Regiment
 Second Hussar Regiment
 Third Hussar Regiment

Artillery and engineers
 Hesse-Cassel Artillery corps
 Hesse-Hanau Artillery
 King of England and German engineers

In popular culture
The Hessian fly, a significant pest of cereal crops, was named after its supposed arrival in North America in Hessian soldiers' straw bedding.
Washington Irving's story "The Legend of Sleepy Hollow" (1820) includes a celebrated figure known as the "Headless Horseman" who is "the ghost of a Hessian trooper, whose head had been carried away by a cannon-ball, in some nameless battle during the Revolutionary War". He has been portrayed in many dramatic adaptations of the story.
D. W. Griffith co-wrote and directed the short film, The Hessian Renegades (1909), about the early stages of the American Revolution.
In the Merrie Melodies short Bunker Hill Bunny (1950), set during the Revolutionary War, Bugs Bunny faces off against Hessian soldier Sam von Schamm. At the end, a Sam resigns with the line "I'm a Hessian without no aggression."
The final episode of the cartoon series The Super 6 (1967) features Capt. Zammo in "The Hessians Are Coming" where, after a parody of Paul Revere's midnight ride, Captain Zammo and Private Hammo are dispatched to zip back in time to 1776 and report to General George Washington to foil the malicious machinations of the marauding invaders.
The 1972 novel The Hessian, by Howard Fast, concerns a young Hessian drummer who is executed in reprisal for the mistaken hanging of an autistic villager by his officer.
In the television series Turn: Washington's Spies, Hessians are depicted in season one as participating in the Battle of Trenton and meet Abraham Woodhull in New York.
The PBS cartoon series, Liberty's Kids, featured Hessians as members of the British Army in several episodes, with the episode, "The Hessians are Coming" ending with several Hessian troops deserting to the American side.
In Empire: Total War, the player can recruit up to five regiments of Hessians in their American colonies if playing as Great Britain.
In Assassin's Creed III, if Ratonhnaké:ton has maximum notoriety, Hessians will be sent after him and are notably more skilled then other types of soldiers in the game.

References

Further reading

 Atwood, Rodney. The Hessians: Mercenaries from Hessen-Kassel in the American Revolution (Cambridge University Press, 1980), the standard scholarly history
 Baer, Friederike. Hessians: German Soldiers in the American Revolutionary War (Oxford University Press, 2022). Website
 Crytzer, Brady J. Hessians: Mercenaries, Rebels, and the War for British North America (2015). excerpt
 
 Fetter, Frank Whitson. “Who Were the Foreign Mercenaries of the Declaration of Independence?” Pennsylvania Magazine of History and Biography, vol. 104, no. 4, 1980, pp. 508–513. online

 Ingrao, Charles. "'Barbarous Strangers': Hessian State and Society during the American Revolution", American Historical Review (1982) 87#4 pp. 954–976 in JSTOR
 Ingrao, Charles W. The Hessian mercenary state: ideas, institutions, and reform under Frederick II, 1760–1785 (Cambridge University Press, 2003)
 Krebs, Daniel. "Useful Enemies: The Treatment of German Prisoners of War during the American War of Independence," Journal of Military History (2013), 77#1 pp 9–39.
 
 Mauch, Christof. "Images of America – Political Myths – Historiography: 'Hessians' in the War of Independence", Amerikastudien (2003) 48#3 pp 411–423
 
 Miller, Ken, Dangerous Guests: Enemy Captives and Revolutionary Communities during the War for Independence (Cornell Univ. Press, 2014) online review
 Neimeyer, Charles Patrick. America Goes to War: A Social History of the Continental Army (1995) complete text online 
 Rogers, Alec D. "The Hessians: Journal Of The Johannes Schwalm Historical Association" Journal of the American Revolution (2018) Online

Primary sources
 Winthrop P. Bell, ed. "A Hessian conscript's account of life in garrison at Halifax at the time of the American Revolution". Collections of the Nova Scotia Historical Society, Volume 27, 1947
 Johann Conrad Döhla. A Hessian Diary of the American Revolution (1993)

 Valentine C. Hubbs, ed. Hessian journals: unpublished documents of the American Revolution (Camden House, 1981), translation of the Von Jungkenn manuscripts.

 Huth, Hans, Carl Emil Curt von Donop, and C. V. Easum. "Letters from a Hessian mercenary." Pennsylvania Magazine of History and Biography 62.4 (1938): 488–501. online

External links

 American Revolution.org – The Hessians
 Johannes Schwalm Historical Association website
 Historical Project: Letters by a Hessian Officer, Marburg University
 Diary and letters covering the role of Hessian troops in America
 
 Soldatenhandel under Friedrich I of Hessen-Kassel (German Wikipedia)
 "Hessians:" German Soldiers in the American Revolutionary War. Academic blog with original German sources, English translations, and commentary.

Infantry
American Revolutionary War
Combat occupations
Hesse
Hessian military personnel of the American Revolutionary War
German units in British service in the American Revolutionary War